Michelle Sinclair, known professionally as Belladonna, is an American former pornographic and erotic actress, director, producer, and model. Since announcing her retirement from pornography in 2012, she has acted in several mainstream films, including Inherent Vice and The Ladies of the House.

Early life 
Sinclair grew up as the second of seven children in a Mormon family in Salt Lake City. 
Her father was a retired Air Force captain and former bishop in the LDS Church.

Career 
Sinclair started performing in pornography in Los Angeles at age 18.
One of her early films featured a rough group sex scene with her and twelve men, staged in a prison. She has since appeared in over 300 adult films, including titles such as Service Animals 6 & 7, She-Male Domination Nation, Bella Loves Jenna, Back 2 Evil, Weapons of Ass Destruction, and Fashionistas Safado: The Challenge. In 2002 she featured in the multi award-winning BDSM themed Fashionistas; its director John Stagliano described her as "a woman with the most incredible sexual abilities I’ve ever seen." As well as Stagliano she has often been directed by Nacho Vidal, Jules Jordan and Rocco Siffredi.

Appearances 
She has appeared several times in the reality television series Family Business, which focuses on the life of porn director Adam Glasser a.k.a. "Seymore Butts". In 2004 she was one of a number of porn stars photographed by Timothy Greenfield-Sanders for a "coffee table book" on the adult industry, XXX: 30 Porn-Star Portraits; she also appears in the HBO documentary Thinking XXX about the making of the book.

In 2011, she was named by CNBC as one of the 12 most popular stars in porn. CNBC noted that while she had stepped back from acting to pursue directing and producing, she has maintained a loyal fan base, and has been nominated for 42 AVN awards and won 10 in the course of her career.

Primetime special 
Her career in the pornography business was followed for two years by a crew from ABC Television, culminating in a January 2003 interview for ABC's Primetime with Diane Sawyer.
In the interview, she broke down in tears while talking about experiencing abuse and depression. The segment led to backlash from other pornography performers but also boosted her career.

Retirement and later career 
In August 2007, Sinclair decided to semi-retire from performing with other people over concerns about sexually transmitted infections, specifically herpes. She thought she had contracted herpes in 2002 and was worried the disease had spread; however, it was later discovered that it was a skin rash rather than herpes.

In 2008, she came out of retirement, and filmed a number of hardcore scenes. She appeared in Digital Playground's Pirates II, the sequel to their top-selling DVD, Pirates. She has also appeared recurringly in James Gunn's PG Porn.

Sinclair was featured on the cover of the second album of British metalcore band Asking Alexandria, titled Reckless & Relentless, released in 2011. She also later featured in their short film Through Sin + Self Destruction.

In July 2012, she announced via Twitter that she was "no longer interested in having sex on camera" and would be pursuing her other interests. In 2014, she made her non-pornographic feature film debut in John Wildman's The Ladies of the House (working title Stripped), a horror film about a group of female cannibals. She appeared in Paul Thomas Anderson's film Inherent Vice as Clancy Charlock in 2014 and in a short film titled Dream Murder Machine in 2018. She also considered becoming a sex positive speaker and instructor.

Personal life 
Sinclair's husband Aiden Kelly worked as a website developer for the pornographic film distributor Evil Angel.
She gave birth to a daughter in 2005.

Awards

AVN Awards 

The AVN Awards are sponsored and presented by the American adult video industry trade magazine AVN (Adult Video News). Belladona has been nominated for 43 AVN Awards, of which she has won 10. In 2011, she was inducted into the AVN Hall of Fame.

XRCO Awards 
The XRCO Awards are given by the X-Rated Critics Organization annually to people working in adult entertainment.

F.A.M.E. Awards 
The Fans of Adult Media and Entertainment Awards (F.A.M.E.) were created in 2006 by Genesis magazine, WantedList.com, Adult Video News, and Adam & Eve as a means for the public to vote for their favorites.

Ninfa Prize 
Ninfa Prizes are awarded at the annual Spanish pornographic film festival, the Festival Internacional de Cine Erótico de Barcelona.

XBIZ Awards

AFWG Awards

NightMoves Awards

See also

References

External links 

1980s births
American pornographic film actresses
American film producers
American pornographic film directors
American pornographic film producers
Women pornographic film directors
Women pornographic film producers
Living people
21st-century American actresses
Feminism and pornography
21st-century American women
American women film producers